State Road 609 (NM 609) is an approximately  state highway in the US state of New Mexico. NM 609's western terminus is at U.S. Route 491 (US 491) in Gallup, and the eastern terminus is at NM 118 and Historic U.S. Route 66 in Gallup.

Major intersections

See also

References

609
Transportation in McKinley County, New Mexico
Gallup, New Mexico